Michael J. Ryan (died 24 October 1952) was an Irish barrister, professor and an independent member of Seanad Éireann.

He was elected to the 5th Seanad at the 1944 election for the National University constituency. He lost his seat at the 1948 election.

References

Year of birth missing
1952 deaths
Independent members of Seanad Éireann
Members of the 5th Seanad
Irish barristers
Members of Seanad Éireann for the National University of Ireland